North Eastern Railway (NER) No. 66 Aerolite is a preserved British steam locomotive. It was classified X1 by the LNER. It was capable of reaching 55 mph (89 km/h).

History
Aerolite was built in 1869 as a replacement for an engine of the same name built by Kitson's for the Great Exhibition in 1851 and which was destroyed in a collision in 1868. The engine, like its predecessor, was used to haul the Mechanical Engineer's saloon. Originally a 2-2-2WT well tank, side tanks were added 1886, and around this time it received the number 66.

In 1892 Aerolite was rebuilt into a 4-2-2T, destroying much of the original engine. The well tank was removed, the side tanks expanded, and the two-cylinder Worsdell-von Borries compounding system applied.  In 1902 it was again rebuilt into a 2-2-4T.

Aerolite was withdrawn in 1933 and preserved in 1934 at the LNER's York museum. It can be seen as a static exhibit at the National Railway Museum in York.

References

External links

 The Wilson Worsdell X1 2-2-4T Locomotive 'Aerolite' LNER Encyclopedia

2-2-4T locomotives
4-2-2 locomotives
2-2-2 locomotives
0066
Preserved steam locomotives of Great Britain
Compound locomotives
Railway locomotives introduced in 1869

Passenger locomotives